Mirabilis is a genus of plants in the family Nyctaginaceae known as the four-o'clocks or umbrellaworts. The best known species may be Mirabilis jalapa, the plant most commonly called four o'clock.

There are several dozen species in the genus, of herbaceous plants, mostly found in the Americas.  Some form tuberous roots that enable them to perennate through dry and cool seasons.  They have small, often fragrant, deep-throated flowers.

Although best known as ornamental plants, at least one species, mauka (M. expansa), is grown for food.

Selected species
Mirabilis albida (Walter) Heimerl
Mirabilis alipes (S.Watson) Pilz
Mirabilis coccinea (Torr.) Benth. & Hook.f.
Mirabilis elegans (Choisy) Heimerl
Mirabilis expansa (Ruiz & Pav.) Standl.
Mirabilis greenei S.Watson
Mirabilis himalaica (Edgew.) Heimerl
Mirabilis himalaica var. chinensis Heimerl
Mirabilis himalaica var. himalaica
Mirabilis jalapa L.
Mirabilis laevis (Benth.) Curran
Mirabilis laevis var. crassifolia (Choisy) Spellenb.
Mirabilis laevis var. laevis
Mirabilis laevis var. retrorsa (A.Heller) Jeps.
Mirabilis laevis var. villosa (Kellogg) Spellenb.
Mirabilis linearis (Pursh) Heimerl
Mirabilis linearis var. decipiens (Standl.) S.L.Welsh
Mirabilis linearis var. linearis
Mirabilis linearis var. subhispida (Heimerl) Spellenb.
Mirabilis longiflora L.
Mirabilis macfarlanei Constance & Rollins
Mirabilis multiflora (Torr.) A.Gray
Mirabilis nyctaginea (Michx.) MacMill.
Mirabilis oblongifolia
Mirabilis oxybaphoides (A.Gray) A.Gray
Mirabilis pumila
Mirabilis rotundifolia (Greene) Standl.
Mirabilis tenuiloba
Mirabilis viscosa Cav.

References

External links

 
Night-blooming plants
Caryophyllales genera
Taxa named by Carl Linnaeus